Mian Abdul Sattar is a Pakistani politician who had been a member of the National Assembly of Pakistan from 2008 to 2013.

Political career
He was elected to the National Assembly of Pakistan from Constituency NA-193 (Rahim Yar Khan-II) as a candidate of Pakistan Peoples Party (PPP) in 2008 Pakistani general election. He received 58,572 votes and defeated Sheikh Muhammad Anwar, a candidate of Pakistan Muslim League (Q) (PML-Q).

He ran for the seat of the National Assembly from Constituency NA-193 (Rahim Yar Khan-II) as an independent candidate in 2013 Pakistani general election, but was unsuccessful. He received 51 vote and lost the seat to Sheikh Fayyaz Ud Din.

References

Living people
Pakistani MNAs 2008–2013
Punjab MPAs 1988–1990
Punjab MPAs 1990–1993
Punjab MPAs 1997–1999
Year of birth missing (living people)